Coastal Grooves is the debut LP record by Blood Orange. It was released August 30, 2011 under Domino Recording Company. The album featured no guest appearances and was produced by Ariel Rechtshaid in Los Angeles. Domino Record Company describes the album as highlighting the glamour and drama of New York City in the 1980s.

Music 
The album incorporates stylistic elements of indie rock, baroque pop, folk, contemporary R&B, jazz, soul, and electronic music. By fusing many of these elements together, Blood Orange captures sounds of grooviness, reverbed guitar lines, and piano synths to create music that is described as being a part of a post-punk atmosphere. In a November 2013 article Complex magazine listed the album's cover as one of the "50 Best Pop Album Covers of the Past Five Years", also stating that Hynes was "inspired by transgender icons, like Octavia St. Laurent while he was wrapping production on the LP." In the music video for "I'm Sorry We Lied," produced by Domino Recording Company and directed by Abteen Bagheri in 2012, the story follows Blood Orange and a woman's night life adventure in New York City. Aside from "I'm Sorry We Lied," Many works on the album are also said to be inspired by the after-hours environment of NYC. In 2010, Blood Orange underwent throat surgery and as a result, the album is sung mainly in falsetto.

Track listing

Personnel
 Devonté Hynes – vocals, music, lyrics, production, guitar, keyboards, bass, percussion, drums
 Ariel Rechtshaid - production, percussion, mixing, engineering
 Nedelle Torrisi - additional vocals (2,7)
 Justin Meldal-Johnsen - bass
 Chris Rakestraw - additional engineering
 Garrett Ray - drums
 Howie Weinberg - mastering
 David Schiffman - mixing
 Brian Lantelme - photography

Reception 
The album has a rating of 72/100 on Metacritic based on 18 reviews, indicating generally favorable reviews. A reviewer for Pitchfork wrote that Coastal Grooves omits catchy choruses and melodies in favor of stark guitar lines and seductive mumbling but ultimately gave the album a rating of a 5.9/10.

References

External links
 Official Tumblr Page
Official Soundcloud Page
Official YouTube Channel

2011 albums
Dev Hynes albums
Domino Recording Company albums